Divine authority may refer to:

 God, or God's power.
 Divine right of kings - claims of divinity or authority such as in the titular "king of kings".
 Mandate of Heaven - the Eastern version of the divine right of kings.
 God Emperor (disambiguation) - various rulers who claim a divine relationship.
 Scripture - the authority of religious texts.
 Sola scriptura - the concept that the Bible alone has authority.